Dănutz S.R.L. is a TV show broadcast on TVR1 from 2004 to 2012. The show was presented by Dan Bittman. Antonio Passarelli and his band Marfar were the permanent guests.

References

External links
 https://web.archive.org/web/20110612155949/http://www.tvr.ro/emisiune.php?id=561
 https://web.archive.org/web/20110612160035/http://www.tvr.ro/articol.php?id=89823
 http://www.viva.ro/Vedete/Exclusiv-Viva-ro/Dan-Bittman-Reintalnire-cu-Cristi-Minculescu-1480294
 http://www.adevarul.ro/locale/bucuresti/Emisiunea_Danut_SRL_implineste_astazi_7_ani_0_346765549.html
 http://www.libertatea.ro/stire/emisiunea-danutz-srl-implineste-sapte-ani-305567.html

Romanian television series
TVR (TV network) original programming